A Dedicated Man is the second novel by Canadian detective fiction writer Peter Robinson in the Inspector Banks series of novels. The novel was first printed in 1988, but has been reprinted a number of times since.

External links
Dedicated page on author's website

1988 Canadian novels
Novels by Peter Robinson (novelist)
Novels set in Yorkshire